Corey D. Heim (born July 5, 2002) is an American professional stock car racing driver. He competes full-time in the NASCAR Craftsman Truck Series, driving the No. 11 Toyota Tundra for TRICON Garage. He has previously competed ARCA Menards Series East and West Series.

Racing career

Early career
Heim raced in Legends cars, winning the 2016 Young Lions division and the 2017 Thursday Thunder Pro division championship at Atlanta Motor Speedway. He later transitioned to running super late models, driving in events sanctioned by the CARS Tour, Southern Super Series, Pro All-Stars Series (PASS), and NASCAR Whelen All-American Series. 
Late in 2018, Heim crossed the finish line first in the ValleyStar Credit Union 300, but lost the race on a rules procedure. A short time later, he won his first super late model race, at South Boston Speedway. Even after moving up to national touring series, Heim still raced at large late model events like Short Track Nationals, and almost scored a PASS win at Richmond Raceway in March 2018 before being disqualified because of engine spacers.

ARCA and NASCAR

Heim began racing in the ARCA Menards Series in 2019. He joined Chad Bryant Racing to run 13 of 20 ARCA Menards Series events in the team's No. 22 car. He scored a top-five finish in his series debut, which came at Five Flags Speedway in March. Despite not running the full season, Heim ended up finishing 10th in the standings. Although he went winless, Heim never failed to finish any of his races, and scored a top 10 in all of them except for Nashville, where he finished 11th.

On January 12, 2020, Heim announced a full-season CARS Late Model Stock Tour schedule with Lee Pulliam Performance. On January 16, it was announced that Heim would join Venturini Motorsports for seven total races: three in the ARCA Menards Series East, and two apiece in the ARCA Menards Series and the ARCA Menards Series West. On January 25, Heim won the SpeedFest 200 late model race in Georgia. On July 24, Heim placed fourth at Kansas Speedway in ARCA Menards Series competition after a flat tire dropped him from second on the final lap. In his return to Kansas in October, Heim led the most laps and won the race.

In 2021, Heim was promoted to a full-time deal with Venturini, driving the No. 20 in the main ARCA Menards Series, replacing Chandler Smith and Ryan Repko. Smith moved up to the Truck Series full-time in 2021 with Kyle Busch Motorsports. Repko's 2021 plans have yet to be announced. Heim's crew chief that year would be Shannon Rursch, who moved over from Venturini's No. 15 car of Drew Dollar. Heim would start the season with a win in the season-opener at Daytona. 

On April 19, Kyle Busch revealed in an interview that Heim would make his Truck Series debut in the No. 51 for his Kyle Busch Motorsports team at Darlington.
Heim made his NCWTS debut at Darlington Raceway on May 7, 2021 in the Kyle Busch Motorsports number 51 truck. He would finish 23rd after being wrecked from behind on a late race restart. 

Heim rejoined KBM for a 15-race Truck schedule in 2022. On March 19, 2022, Heim won his first NCWTS race at his home track of Atlanta with a last lap pass of his teammate Chandler Smith. He won his second race at Gateway, but because he did not run a full-time schedule, he was ineligible for the playoffs. Heim finished the season 14th in points and won the 2022 Camping World Truck Series Rookie of the Year honors.

Personal life
Heim graduated from Kennesaw Mountain High School.

Motorsports career results

NASCAR
(key) (Bold – Pole position awarded by qualifying time. Italics – Pole position earned by points standings or practice time. * – Most laps led.)

Craftsman Truck Series

 Season still in progress
 Ineligible for series points

ARCA Menards Series
(key) (Bold – Pole position awarded by qualifying time. Italics – Pole position earned by points standings or practice time. * – Most laps led.)

ARCA Menards Series East

ARCA Menards Series West

References

External links
 
 

Living people
2002 births
Racing drivers from Atlanta
Racing drivers from Georgia (U.S. state)
People from Marietta, Georgia
ARCA Menards Series drivers
Kyle Busch Motorsports drivers